Diego Spotorno Parra (born July 13, 1975) is an actor and TV host from Ecuador, known for his character Juan Carlos Martinez Cucalón in the comic series Solteros Sin Compromiso.

Biography 
Spotorno was born in Guayaquil on July 13, 1975, with maternal and paternal ancestry Lebanese Argentina. He ventured into television for the first time as host of the Iguana Legal then the channel SiTV, then became part of the conduct of Alo que tal America in Telesistema. In 1997, Spotorno was part of the Teleamazonas lead Tour 97.

In 2001, Spotorno was part of TC Televisión team in the comic series Solteros Sin Compromiso, playing Cucalón Juan Carlos Martinez, where he gained fame. He was absent in certain seasons of the series to be part of a Peruvian soap opera called Todo sobre Camila of Iguana Productions and Doctor Amor of Central Park in Argentina. Spotorno was a member of the cast for  Cosa seria, serious thing of TC Televisión. After completing the series Solteros Sin Compromiso, he worked for Cabledeportes and was part of the programs of the season, Tour 2007 and Tour 2008, and later lead the Gente Cool program of TC Televisión. Acted for a feature film called Nada Personal.

In 2008, he moved to Ecuavisa acting on the soap opera El Secreto de Toño Palomino, as well serving as the host of En Contacto. In 2009, he starred in El exitoso Lcdo. Cardoso. In 2010, he took a leading role in the soap opera La taxista, as Didi, love Rosita incondisional played by Claudia Camposano. In 2012, Spotorno was part of the reality show Ecuador Tiene Talento of the British franchise Got Talent as one of the three judges of the contest.

References

External links
Diego Spotorno vuelve a En Contacto
Diego Spotorno y Efraín Ruales, ‘2 solteros en gira’
Efraín Ruales y Diego Spotorno presentan “2 Solteros en Gira”

1975 births
Living people
Ecuadorian male telenovela actors
Ecuadorian male television actors
Ecuadorian television presenters
People from Guayaquil
Ecuadorian comedians